Les 400 Coups or Les Quatre Cents Coups may refer to:

The 400 Blows, (French: Les Quatre Cents Coups), a 1959 French film directed by François Truffaut
Les 400 coups, a French-Canadian comics publisher